The 2022 national road cycling championships are being held throughout the year and are organised by the UCI member federations. They began in Australia with the men's and women's time trial events on 12 January.

Jerseys 

The winner of each national championship wears the national jersey in all their races for the next year in the respective discipline, apart from the World Championships and the Olympics, or unless they are wearing a classification leader's jersey in a stage race. Most national champion jerseys tend to represent a country's flag or use the colours from it, like the Spanish and British jerseys, respectively. Jerseys may also feature traditional sporting colours of a country that are not derived from a national flag, such as the green and gold jerseys of Australian national champions.

2022 champions

Men's Elite

Champions in UCI Men's teams

Women's Elite

Champions in UCI Women's teams

Notes

References 

National Cycling Championships, 2022
2022
National road cycling championships